William Keith Los'e (22 July 1967 – 7 September 2022) was a n rugby union player who played as a lock. After retiring from playing, he worked as a radio host and TV commentator.

Early life 
Los'e was born on 22 July 1967, the son of Kuini and Tavake Los'e. He grew up in West Auckland and attended Kelston Boys' High School, where he was head prefect.

Playing career
Los'e played three matches for the New Zealand Colts in 1988. Eight years later, he played for Tonga in the 1995 Rugby World Cup, playing all three pool stage matches. Los'e also played in the National Provincial Championship for Auckland, North Harbour and Marlborough. Los'e played in Italy, while he was studying Italian since 1989/90 to 1992/93 for Rugby Prato and for Messina Rugby.

Los'e played in Japan for Yamaha Júbilo.

Broadcasting career
After retiring from playing, Los'e worked as host for The Radio Network, where he hosted Radio Sport. He went on to work as a full-time TV commentator for Super Rugby, ITM Cup and more World Rugby Sevens Series events on Sky TV.

Los'e died on 7 September 2022 in Cape Town, while in South Africa for the 2022 Rugby World Cup Sevens.

References

External links

William Keith Lose at New Zealand Rugby History

1967 births
2022 deaths
Rugby union locks
New Zealand rugby union commentators
New Zealand sportspeople of Tongan descent
Tongan expatriates in Japan
Rugby union players from Auckland
Tonga international rugby union players
Tongan rugby union players
Auckland rugby union players
North Harbour rugby union players
Shizuoka Blue Revs players
People educated at Kelston Boys' High School